Kéo or Nagé-Kéo is a Malayo-Polynesian dialect cluster spoken by the Kéo and Nage people (‘ata Kéo 'Kéo people') that reside in an area southeast of the Ebu Lobo volcano in the south-central part of Nusa Tenggara Timur Province on the island of Flores, eastern Indonesia.

Kéo belongs to the Malayo-Polynesian, Central-Eastern Malayo-Polynesian, Bima-Lembata subgroups of the Austronesian language family and there are approximately 40,000 speakers.

Kéo is sometimes referred to as Nage-Kéo, Nage being the name of a neighbouring ethnic group that is generally considered culturally distinct from Kéo; however, whether or not the two languages are separate entities is ambivalent.

Uncommon to Austronesian languages, Kéo is a highly isolating language that lacks inflectional morphology or clear morphological derivation. Instead it relies more heavily on lexical and syntactic grammatical processes.

Sociolinguistic situation

Kéo (referred to locally as  'our language' or  'the language here' as well as Bahasa Bajawa 'the Bajawa language' by people not from central Flores) has distinct dialectal variation between villages. Kéo speakers are able to determine where someone is from based on pronunciation and word use.

Overall, the attitude towards Kéo by its speakers is unfavourable. It is considered more economically beneficial to speak Indonesian or English. Despite this sentiment, a sense of respect for the language remains through its oral traditions.

Phonology

Consonants 
The Kéo spoken in the village of Udiworowatu (where the majority of data has been collected on the language) has a phonemic inventory of 23 consonants.

There is a four-way stop distinction for manner of articulation: voiceless (unaspirated), voiced, preglottalised and prenasalised. This is atypical for an Austronesian language.
Kéo does not have a contrastive distinction between bilabial  and labio-dental; hence the term labial has been used for the place of articulation.

Vowels 
Kéo has six vowel phonemes.

Morphology I

Pronouns

In Kéo there are seven standard pronoun forms that form a closed word class.

Kéo pronouns have the same form irrespective of their syntactic behaviour. They can function as independent pronouns, as subjects, objects or as  possessors. There are also no grammatical gender distinctions.

In the examples below, the first-person singular pronoun  is used across four different scenarios: as the subject of an intransitive verb (1), as the subject of a transitive verb (2), as an object, (3) and in the possessor slot of a possessive construction (4).

Examples:

Alternate pronoun forms

Their usage can depend on dialectal variants, politeness and taboo avoidance rules and specificity with quantity of people involved in the utterance.

In the past, the two terms were used as a dialect-identifying feature for the Kéo-speaking areas. Nowadays, both pronouns are used and personal preference appears to dictate usage. It has also been noted that a child will apply the term that is used by their mother.

In an example from a Kéo storyteller, both first-person pronoun forms are used stylistically to distinguish the main characters during a passage of direct speech, Wodo Bako  and the sorcerer . This distinction can reflect the storyteller's partiality towards a character depending on which form they themselves identify with.

Examples:

as shown in the 'standard' pronoun form table above is used to address more than one person yet it can also be used to show a level of respect and politeness when speaking to someone.

Example:

is the pronoun used for first-person plural inclusive. In some cases  is used to replace  (first personal plural exclusive) when talking about belongings or possession. This switch in pronoun to include all addressees makes the speaker appear more community-minded and generous opposed to being arrogant or selfish.

Example:

Sira is also used when addressing a large group of people.

Pronoun + numeral

Kéo pronouns can be followed by numerals to indicate the exact number of referents. The pronoun-numeral sequence is the only time a number can be used without a  classifier. The most common numeral used is  'two' (9) to create dual pronouns, yet it is also acceptable to use any other numeral (10).

Examples:

Morphology II

Pronouns and person-marking 

Personal pronouns replace proper nouns or other nouns, and form a closed word class. They are highly dependent on context, and are used to indicate if one is referring to the speaker, listener, etc. (Baird, 2002, pp. 108).

There are five subclasses of nouns; 1) common nouns, 2) kin terms, 3) place names, 4) personal names and 5) personal pronouns (Baird, 2002, pp. 101–102). Thus, unlike English, where pronouns are an independent part of the language, personal pronouns are included under the noun class in Kéo (Baird, 2002, pp. 97). Furthermore, all five of these subclasses, including personal pronouns, may be used as nominal predicates (Baird, 2002, pp. 101).

Personal pronouns

Standard forms 

In Kéo, there is no change in the personal pronoun, even if they are independent pronouns, subjects, objects, possessors, etc. (Baird, 2002, pp. 108). However, first, second, third, (and singular and plural forms) have differences, and the first person plural pronoun has an inclusive and exclusive form. Apart from the first and second person singular pronoun, pronouns may be followed by numbers to quantify the pronoun. Gender is also not differentiated in Kéo pronouns (Baird, 2002, pp. 109).

 First person pronouns
This can be used to express I, me, my, etc. (Baird, 2002, pp. 110). For example:

 Second-person pronouns
This can be used to express you, your, etc. (Baird, 2002, pp. 110). For example:

 Third-person pronouns
This can be used as he, her, etc. (Baird, 2002, pp. 110). For example:

A sentence can also be made to be less ambiguous by using  possessively. (Baird, 2002, pp. 328). In other words, using a pronoun in this way can make the meaning of a sentence clearer to the listener:

Below is an example of both a first-person singular pronoun and a third-person singular pronoun being used in the same sentence:

Alternate forms 

There are also alternate forms of personal pronouns, which are used for different reasons. There are three main reasons as to why alternate pronouns are used. Firstly, alternate pronouns may be used to indicate politeness, or to avoid social taboo. Secondly, they may be used based on dialect variations. Lastly, certain pronouns are used to identify the exact number of people there are in the situation being described or talked about (Baird, 2002, pp. 111).

The first alternate form, is an alternate form of the first-person singular pronoun,  (standard form). Initially, each dialect group used either one exclusively, and was a way to identify which Kéo -speaking area one was from. However, the use of the standard and alternate form of the pronoun no longer has this ability to establish one’s dialect group (Baird, 2002, pp. 111). This will be further discussed below in Regional Varieties.

It is often used in reference to more than one person, but can also be used to address one person as an honorific. (Baird, 2002, pp. 112). For example:

As mentioned above, first-person plural pronouns have an exclusive and inclusive form in Kéo (Baird, 2002, pp. 110). However, the alternate and inclusive form, frequently replaces  (the exclusive form). Using the inclusive form instead of the exclusive form helps the speaker to seem more generous and selfless, as they are including the listener in their speech. Especially when discussing property and personal possessions, the speaker can sound less arrogant by using the inclusive term instead of the exclusive term. (Baird, 2002, pp. 113). For example:

Another example which shows the importance of inclusivity in Kéo is where Kéo is often referred to as 'our language' instead of just Kéo. (Baird, 2002, pp. 9).

This pronoun may be used instead of second- and third-person pronouns. The main reason  is used is as an honorific. It is often used to greet people, and to refer to in-laws or others as a sign of respect. Kin terms, which is what identifies the relationship between speakers (Baird, 2002, pp. 105), are also preferred when addressing in-laws, to establish a close relationship.

 Regional varieties 
Pronouns help to differentiate dialects. In the past, the difference in the first person singular pronoun  and  helped to establish this difference. However, in present times intermarriages between different dialect groups have dissolved these boundaries. Instead, which first person singular pronoun is used is up to personal preference (Baird, 2002, pp. 28). Apart from personal preference, many Kéo speakers have the tendency to follow the form that their mother uses, (Baird, 2002, pp. 111) while some adopt the form that their in-laws use after marriage (Baird, 2002, pp. 112).

Syntax

Possession

Adnominal possession 
 There are two types
 possessive particle is used to link noun phrases. (Eg.  (water-POSS-1st plural exclusive) ('our water'))
 possessor can either be a noun phrase or a pronoun. (Eg.  (father-1st plural exclusive) ('our father'))

Negation 
These negators are synonymous.

Negators can precede the predicate, be predicates themselves, and be interjections.

References

Bibliography

 
 

Sumba languages
Languages of Indonesia
Isolating languages